Bernard Moses Casper (1916–1988) was a British-South African rabbi. He born and raised in London; educated in London and Cambridge; and served as both a Rabbi and educator in Manchester and London. He was a commissioned Chaplain in the British Army through most of the Second World War, and served with distinction as Senior Chaplain of the Jewish Infantry Brigade Group, earning a Mention in Despatches. In 1956, he was appointed the first Dean for Student Affairs at the Hebrew University of Jerusalem, and was called to Johannesburg in 1963 as Chief Rabbi of the United Hebrew Congregation of Johannesburg. In 1964 he became Chief Rabbi of the Federation of Synagogues of South Africa.

References

Chief rabbis of South Africa
World War II chaplains
Rabbis in the military
1916 births
1988 deaths
Royal Army Chaplains' Department officers
Jewish Brigade personnel